Maddox Peak is a peak standing at the south side of the mouth of Carbutt Glacier, east of Flandres Bay, on the west coast of Graham Land, Antarctica. The peak appears on an Argentine government chart of 1954. It was named by the UK Antarctic Place-Names Committee in 1960 for English physician and pioneer of photography Richard L. Maddox, who invented the gelatin emulsion process of dry-plate photography in 1871, revolutionizing photographic technique.

References

Mountains of Graham Land
Danco Coast